The St. Philip's Episcopal Church, at 701 Main St. in Rosebud, Montana, was built in 1906.  It was listed on the National Register of Historic Places in 2007.  It has also been known as the Rosebud Community Church and as the Little Log Church.

It is a gable-front log building with a vestibule.  It was built by carpenters Fred L. Mefford and Al Drescher.  It is a relatively rare surviving example of work by Al Drescher, who built much of Rosebud.  Drescher immigrated to the U.S. from Germany in 1888, at age 23.  The church is unusual among Drescher's work as a log structure rather than a frame structure.

References

Episcopal church buildings in Montana
Log buildings and structures on the National Register of Historic Places in Montana
Churches completed in 1906
1906 establishments in Montana
National Register of Historic Places in Rosebud County, Montana